ʾAḥmad ibn Muḥammad ibn Hārūn ibn Yazīd al Baghdādī better known as Abū Bakr al Khalāl, was a Medieval Muslim jurist.

Al-Khallal was a student of five of Ahmad ibn Hanbal's direct students, including Ibn Hanbal's son Abdullah. His documentation on Ibn Hanbal's views eventually reached twenty volumes and ultimately led to the preservation of the Hanbali school of Islamic law. He was considered the principal Hanbalite scholar of his time.

Life
Al-Khallal's exact date of birth is not known. He died in 923, which means that he would have been born during Ibn Hanbal's twilight years. The Oxford International Encyclopaedia of Legal History estimates al-Khallal's year of birth as 848.

Aside from his legal efforts, virtually nothing is known of al-Khallal's life. During his efforts to compile the views of Ibn Hanbal, al-Khallal ended up spending periods of time living in Fars Province, Syria and Mesopotamia. According to Muslim historian Al-Dhahabi, there was no such thing as an independent Hanbalite school of law prior to al-Khallal's efforts at compiling Ibn Hanbal's views. Al-Khallal's status within the school was not universally accepted, and he and his students were often in conflict with fellow Hanbalite Al-Hasan ibn 'Ali al-Barbahari and his students.

Reception
The historian al-Dhahabi stated that, "Before him (al-Khallal) there were no independent school of the imam's; not until he followed up Ahmed's texts, wrote them down and checked their proofs after 300."

The 20th century Hanbali jurisprudent Ibn Badran called al-Khallal's collection "the very root of the Hanbali school, from which sprang all later books of Hanbali jurisprudence".

Citations

External links
Bibliography at Alibris

Atharis
Hanbalis
Sunni Muslim scholars of Islam
Year of birth unknown
923 deaths
9th-century Muslim scholars of Islam
9th-century jurists
10th-century jurists